Đức Phổ Base Camp (also known as Đức Phổ Airfield, LZ Bronco, LZ Montezuma and Núi Đàng) is a former U.S. Marine Corps and U.S. Army base in the Đức Phổ District, Quảng Ngãi Province Vietnam.

History

1966-71
The base was located along Highway 1 approximately midway between Da Nang and Qui Nhơn.

LZ Montezuma was originally established by the U.S Marine Corps' Task Force X-Ray and the 2nd Battalion 5th Marines and 3rd Battalion 7th Marines were based here until 1 April 1967 when they were replaced by the 1st Cavalry Division in Operation Lejeune.

The 1st Cavalry Division built a runway capable of landing de Havilland Canada C-7 Caribou aircraft at the base in early April. At the end of April the 1st Cavalry Division handed over the base to 3rd Brigade, 25th Infantry Division comprising:
1st Battalion, 14th Infantry
1st Battalion, 35th Infantry
2nd Battalion, 35th Infantry

On 1 August 1967 the 3rd Brigade became part of the 4th Infantry Division, while the 4th Infantry Division's 3rd Brigade at Dầu Tiếng Base Camp became part of the 25th Infantry Division.

Đức Phổ served as the base for the 101st Airborne Division from June–November 1967.

Other units stationed at Đức Phổ included:
2nd Battalion, 11th Artillery (April 1967-January 1968)
6th Battalion, 11th Artillery (December 1967-September 1971)
3rd Battalion, 1st Infantry (December 1967-June 1971)
198th Light Infantry Brigade (October–November 1967)

On 3 August 1967 a C-7 Caribou (#62-4161) on approach to Đức Phổ was hit by an outgoing 155mm shell which severed its tail section causing the aircraft to crash killing all 3 crewmen. The falling C-7 was photographed by Hiromichi Mine just before impact.

Current use
The base is abandoned and turned over to farmland, light industry and housing.

References

Installations of the United States Army in South Vietnam
Military installations closed in the 1970s
Military installations of the United States Marine Corps in South Vietnam
Buildings and structures in Quảng Ngãi province